The CEB European Three-cushion Championship is three-cushion billiards tournament organized by the Confédération Européenne de Billard. Held since 1932, it is one of longest-running tournaments in the sport. The 2007 event offered a total purse of €18,500 (US$26,134) with €4,000 ($5,651) for the winner.

Before 1995, there was a third place match played between the two losing finalists, in order to determine the ranking. However, the match has been cancelled since then and the losing finalists are regarded as having the same ranking in the competition.

Since the season 2012/13 the tournament was held in a mammoth event every two years in Brandenburg an der Havel, Germany.

History 
Until the Second World War the European Championships were held only in the disciplines balkline and in three-cushion, and that even more irregular. After the war (1947) a regular, annual cycle was introduced. Exception was the season 1995/96. This had to do with the association disputes between the World Federation Union Mondiale de Billard (UMB) and the Billiards World Cup Association (BWA). It also meant that the players which were under contract with the BWA in the years 1993 to 1997 were not allowed to participate at the European Championship.

In the season 1956/57, there have been  already two associations. In the dispute over sports and leadership policies within the "Union Internationale des Fédérations d'Amateurs de Billard" (UIFAB) culminated in the founding of the competing "Fédération Internationale de Billard" (FIB) and a "double" European Championships were held in straight rail, balkline, and three-cushion in 1957. The following year, the disputes were resolved and UIFAB was again the only European federation. This fusion was expressed in the founding/renamed into Confédération Européenne de Billard (CEB) on 12. July 1958.

Prize money and ranking points

Tournament records (timeline) 
Billiard legend Raymond Ceulemans from Belgium won the tournament more times (23) than any other player. His closest competitors for the record are country fellow René Vingerhoedt and Swedish Torbjörn Blomdahl at a distant 9 and 8 respectively. By delivering the European Champion for 22 consecutive years (1962-1983), Belgium also holds the record for most consecutive wins.

In 2013 Marco Zanetti played a new record General Average (GA) of 2.500. Frédéric Caudron puts up a new European record in High-run of 28 and equalizes the records of Junichi Komori (1993), Raymond Ceulemans (1998), and Roland Forthomme (2012).

Champions
The GA indicates the General Average.

Note
 *1 Since there were two competing and fractious associations at that time, namely, Union Internationale des Fédérations d'Amateurs de Billard (UIFAB) und Fédération Internationale de Billard (FIB), two different championships were held. Since the players could only affiliate to one of the associations, there was no overlapping of the participants of the respective European Championship.
 *2 New European record

Medals (1932-2022)

See also
UMB World Three-cushion Championship
Cue sports at the World Games

References

External links 
 

Three-cushion billiards competitions
Three-cushion
Recurring sporting events established in 1932